Adrian James Croce is the self-titled fifth album by American singer-songwriter A. J. Croce, released in 2004 (see 2004 in music).

Track listing
all songs written by A. J. Croce, except where noted

"Don't Let Me Down" (Croce, Steve Poltz) – 3:25
"Baby Tonight" – 3:11
"Call Me Dear" – 3:03
"Lying on the Ground" (Croce) – 4:10
"Too Soon" (Laurie Barth, Croce, Dave Howard) – 2:53
"I Believe" (Croce, Poltz) – 3:35
"Upside Down" (Croce, Howard) – 4:10
"Cold" – 1:48
"You're Not There" – 2:49
"Alone and Together" – 3:02
"Hung Up (On You)" – 3:12
"What You Want" – 3:41
"Almost Angeline" (Croce, Howard) – 2:58
"How Long" – 4:44

Personnel
A. J. Croce – organ, acoustic guitar, guitar, piano, electric piano, vocals, background vocals
David Curtis – bass
Davey Faragher – bass
Dave Howard  – background vocals
Nick Kirgo – electric guitar, slide guitar
Greg Leisz – mandolin
Phil Smith – background vocals

Production
String arrangements: A. J. Croce, Herman Jackson

References

A. J. Croce albums
2004 albums